Marles-sur-Canche (literally Marles on Canche) is a commune in the Pas-de-Calais department in the Hauts-de-France region of France.

Geography
Marles-sur-Canche is situated in the valley of the Canche river, 2.3 miles (4 km) southeast of Montreuil-sur-Mer, on the D113 road.

Population

Places of interest
 The seventeenth century church of St. Firmin.

See also
Communes of the Pas-de-Calais department

References

Marlessurcanche